The discography of Razorlight, an English indie rock band, consists of four studio albums, one compilation album and thirteen singles. Razorlight's debut album, Up All Night, was released in the United Kingdom in June 2004 and reached number three on the UK Album Chart. The album included the single, "Somewhere Else", which peaked at number two on the UK Singles Chart. The band contributed the song "Kirby's House" to the War Child charity album Help!: A Day in the Life.

The band released their second album, Razorlight, in July 2006 and it debuted at number one in the UK. The lead single from the album, "In the Morning", peaked at number three in the UK. The band's third album, Slipway Fires, was issued in November 2008, preceded by the lead single "Wire to Wire". The second single was "Hostage of Love"; however, it failed to enter the charts in any other country than Germany. As a result planned further releases from the album were cancelled. After a ten-year break, the band released their fourth album, Olympus Sleeping, in October 2018.

Albums

Studio albums

Compilation albums

Singles

Notes

A^ "Rip It Up" was originally released in the UK in 2003 and peaked at number 42, but was re-released in 2004 and reached new peak of 20.

Music videos
 "Rock 'n' Roll Lies"
 "Vice"
 "Stumble and Fall"
 "Golden Touch"
 "Somewhere Else"
 "In the Morning"
 "I Can't Stop This Feeling I've Got"
 "America"
 "Wire to Wire"
 "Hostage of Love"

Notes

References 

Discographies of British artists
Discographies of Swedish artists
Rock music group discographies
Discography